The Pan American Men's Youth Handball Championship was the official competition for youth men's national handball teams of Americas, and took place every two years. In addition to crowning the Pan American champions, the tournament also served as a qualifying tournament for the Youth World Championship.

Summary

Medal table

Participating nations

References

External links
 www.panamhandball.org

 
Pan-American Team Handball Federation competitions